The Faithful Heart may refer to:

 The Faithful Heart (play), a 1921 play by Monckton Hoffe
 The Faithful Heart (1922 film), a British film
 Cœur fidèle, a 1923 French film with the English title The Faithful Heart
 The Faithful Heart (1932 film), a British film